Oreet Ashery (born 1966 in Jerusalem) is an Israeli interdisciplinary artist based in London.

Career
Ashery received her BA (distinction) in Fine Art from Sheffield Hallam University in 1992, followed by her MA in Fine Arts from Central Saint Martins in 2000. Her work explores ideological, social and gender constructions through an interdisciplinary practice, spanning installation, video, live art, and 2-D image making.

Ashery's earlier work was often produced as a male character of her own creation, exploring gender relationships and those between woman and cultural identity. Ashery's most consistent character is Marcus Fisher, an orthodox Jewish man found in works such as Dancing with Men and Marcus Fisher | Say Cheese, but she has produced as other male characters, including an Arab man, a Norwegian postman and a black man.

Ashery's more recent work has been based on Mayakovsky's 1921 play Mystery-Bouffe. This work confronts social and class biases alongside issues of political power and agency. Her performance at the Tate Modern The World is Flooding in 2014 was followed by an exhibition Animal with a Language at Waterside Contemporary, both of which saw Ashery work with participants from Freedom from Torture, UK Lesbian and Gay Immigration Group, Portugal Prints, and others, to explore these themes.

Ashery has exhibited and performed at various international venues, such as ZKM, Karlsruhe; Haus der Kulturen der Welt, Berlin; Brooklyn Museum, New York; Overgaden, Copenhagen; DEPO, Istanbul; Whitstable Biennale; Centre Pompidou, Paris; Auto Italia South East, London; Freud Museum, London and Wellcome Collection, London producing works that explore her personal politics and identity in relation to wider social and cultural contexts. Her work is included in the permanent collections of the MAG Collection at the Ferens Gallery and the Tate.

In 2020 Ashery was awarded a one-off Turner bursary of £10,000. These were awarded to ten artists instead of the usual Turner Prize, which was delayed because of the coronavirus pandemic. She was selected for her contribution to Misbehaving Bodies: Jo Spence and Oreet Ashery at the Wellcome Collection, which explored lived experiences of care and chronic illness. The jury were particularly moved by her new film Dying Under Your Eyes and the innovative web series Revisiting Genesis following two nurses who assist people actively preparing for death to create biographical slideshows serving as their posthumous digital legacy.

Awards 
 2020 Turner bursary
 2017 Winner, The Jarman Award
 2014 Fine Art Fellowship, Stanley Picker Fellowship
 20132015 Visiting Professor, Royal College of Art, Painting Department
 20112014 Honorary Research Fellow, School of English and Drama, Queen Mary University of London
 20072010 Arts and Humanities Research Council Creative Research Fellow, Drama Department, Queen Mary University of London

Solo exhibitions
2019-2020

 Misbehaving Bodies: Jo Spence and Oreet Ashery. Wellcome Collection, London, UK

2017-2018
Revisiting Genesis. 6th Thessaloniki Biennale of Contemporary Art

2016
Revisiting Genesis. Stanley Picker Gallery, Kingston, UK
Revisiting Genesis. Tyneside Cinema, UK

2015
Oreet Ashery. Revisiting Genesis, fig-2, ICA, London, UK
Animal with a Language. Campagne Prèmiere, Berlin, Germany

2014 
Animal with a Language. Waterside Contemporary, London, UK

2013 
Party for Freedom. Hippolythe, Helsinki, Finland
Party for Freedom. Overgaden, Copenhagen, Denmark

2012 
Monkey Bum Prints Factory. Pristine Gallery, Mexico
Oreet Ashery, with Nicole Ahland. C. Wichtendahl. Galerie, 5th European Month of Photography, Berlin, Germany

2011 
Falafel Road, with Larissa Sansour. DEPO, Istanbul, Turkey

2010 
The Beautiful Jew. Other Gallery, Shanghai, China
Raging Balls. Other Gallery, Beijing, China

2009 
Back in 5 Minutes and Scratch Performance: Golani Varanasi. The Arches, Glasgow, UK

2008 
Dancing with Men. Sherwell Centre, Plymouth University, Plymouth, UK

2007 
What You See, Letchworth Art Centre Gallery, Letchworth, UK

2003 
Performance 2003. Foxy Production Gallery, New York, US 
Say Cheese. Bluecoat Arts Centre, Liverpool, UK

2002 
Oreet Ashery. Foxy Production Gallery, New York, US
7 Acts of Love. Kapelica Gallery, Ljubljana, Slovenia
7 Acts of Love. Stil und Bruch, Berlin, Germany

1998 
Magnum Opus III, with Daniel Rubinstein. Jerusalem Artists’ House Gallery, Jerusalem, Israel

1996 
Magnum Opus II, with Daniel Rubinstein. 68elf Gallery, Cologne, Germany

References

1966 births
Living people
Alumni of Central Saint Martins
Alumni of Sheffield Hallam University
Feminist artists
Interdisciplinary artists
Israeli expatriates in the United Kingdom
Israeli contemporary artists
Artists from Jerusalem
Lesbian Jews
Jewish feminists
Jewish artists
Israeli lesbian artists
English lesbian artists
Israeli feminists